The Don is a 1995 Indian Hindi-language gangster film directed by Farogh Siddique, produced by Salim, and starring Mithun Chakraborty, Sonali Bendre, Jugal Hansraj, and Aashif Sheikh.

Plot

The Don is the story of a common person, later becoming a Don, who always stands for justice and the poor against all odds and evil minds. His sister is yet to forgive him as he had murdered her fiancée.

Cast

 Mithun Chakraborty as Devendra/Deva (The Don)
 Sonali Bendre as Anita Malik
 Jugal Hansraj as Vijay
 Aasif Sheikh as Nagesh
 Prem Chopra as Commissioner Malik
 Kader Khan as Chaprasi Rajaram / Principal Amarnath / Prof. Raghav (triple roles)
 Sadashiv Amrapurkar as Minister Parasuram
 Arjun Firoz Khan as ACP Patil
 Raza Murad as Bhujang
 Rana Jung Bahadur as Jagga
 Goga Kapoor as Bhandari
 Mushtaq Khan as Prajapati
 Kunika as College Professor
 Guddi Maruti as Hostel Warden

Soundtrack

References

External links
 

1995 films
1990s Hindi-language films
Mithun's Dream Factory films
Films shot in Ooty
Films scored by Dilip Sen-Sameer Sen
Indian gangster films
Indian crime action films
Indian action drama films
1995 action drama films
1990s crime action films
Films directed by Farogh Siddique